Saint John or St. John usually refers to John the Baptist, but also, sometimes, to John the Apostle.

Saint John or St. John may also refer to:

People

 John the Baptist (0s BC–30s AD), preacher, ascetic, and baptizer of Jesus Christ
 John the Evangelist (c. 15 – 100), presumed author of the Fourth Gospel, traditionally identified with John the Apostle
 John of Patmos, author of the Book of Revelation, traditionally identified with John the Apostle and the Evangelist
 John the Wonderworking Unmercenary (d. c. 304), Egyptian or Mesopotamian healer
 John Chrysostom (c. 340 – 407), Antiochene Archbishop of Constantinople
 John Cassian (360–435), probably Scythia-Minor priest and abbot
 John and Paul (d. 362), Roman martyrs
 John of Egypt (d. 394), Egyptian hermit
 John the Silent (452–558), Bishop of Taxara
 Pope John I (470–526), Italian pope
 John of Ephesus (507–586), Syrian ecclesiastical historian
 John Climacus (579–649), Syrian or Byzantine monk and abbot
 John Scholasticus (died 577), 32nd Patriarch of Constantinople
 Patriarch John IV of Constantinople (d. 595), also known as John the Faster, first Ecumenical Patriarch
 John the Merciful (died c. 610), Cyprian Patriarch of Alexandria
John I Agnus (‘the Lamb’, 7th century), 25th bishop of Tongres
 John III of the Sedre (died 648), Syriac Orthodox Patriarch of Antioch
 John of Damascus (676–749), Syrian monk and priest, also known as John Damascene
 John of Beverley (died 721), Angle bishop
 John of Pavia (died 813), Bishop of Pavia
 John of Rila (876–946), Bulgarian priest and hermit
 John Gualbert (died 1073), Founder of the Vallumbrosan Order
 John Theristus (1049–1129), Italian Benedictine monk
 John of Pulsano (1070–1139), or Giovanni di Matera, Italian abbot
 John of Tufara (1084–1170), Italian monastery founder
 John of the Grating (1098–1168), Bishop of Aleth
 John of Matha (1160–1213), French priest; founder of the Trinitarian Order
 John of Meda (1100–1159), Italian priest

1300s to present
 John Kukuzelis (1280–1360), Byzantine Orthodox Christian composer, singer and reformer
 John of Nepomuk (1340–1393), Bohemian vicar general of Jan of Jenštejn
 Giovanni da Capistrano (1386–1456), Italian friar, summoner of European troops for the 1456 siege of Belgrade
 John Cantius (1390–1473), Polish priest and theologian
 John of Sahagún (1419–1479), Spanish priest
 John Fisher (c. 1460–1535), English cardinal and martyr
 Juan Diego (1474–1548), first Native-American saint
 John Houghton (martyr) (1486–1535), English abbot and martyr (one of the Forty Martyrs of England and Wales)
 John Stone (martyr) (died 1539), English friar and martyr (one of the Forty Martyrs of England and Wales)
 John of God (1495–1550), Portuguese friar; founder of the Brothers Hospitallers of St. John of God
 John of Ávila (1500–1569), Spanish Jewish converso priest, missionary and mystic
 John Payne (martyr) (1532–1582), English priest and martyr (one of the Forty Martyrs of England and Wales)
 John de Ribera (1532–1611), or Juan de Ribera, Bishop of Valencia
 John Leonardi (1541–1609), Italian priest; founder of the Clerks Regular of the Mother of God of Lucca
 John of the Cross (1542–1591), Spanish Jewish converso friar, priest and mystic; joint founder of the Discalced Carmelites
 John Boste (1544–1594), English priest and martyr (one of the Forty Martyrs of England and Wales)
 John Rigby (martyr) (died 1600), English martyr (one of the Forty Martyrs of England and Wales)
 John Roberts (martyr) (c. 1570 – 1610/c. 1570 – 1610), Welsh priest, Prior of Saint Gregory'sone of the Forty Martyrs of England and Wales
 John Sarkander (1576–1620), Polish priest and martyr
 John Ogilvie (saint) (1579–1615), Scottish priest and martyr
 John Jones (martyr) (died 1598), Welsh priest and martyr (one of the Forty Martyrs of England and Wales)
 John Macias (1585–1645), Spanish missionary
 John Southworth (martyr) (1592–1654), English priest and martyr (one of the Forty Martyrs of England and Wales)
 Jean de Brébeuf (1593–1649), French missionary and martyr (one of the North American Martyrs)
 John Francis Regis (1597–1640), French priest
 Jean de Lalande (died 1646), French missionary and martyr (one of the North American Martyrs)
 John Berchmans (1599–1621), Flemish seminarian
 John Kemble (martyr) (1599–1679), English priest and martyr (one of the Forty Martyrs of England and Wales)
 John Eudes (1601–1680), or Jean Eudes, French priest and founder of the Congregation of Jesus and Mary
 John Wall (priest and martyr) (1620–1679), English priest and martyr (one of the Forty Martyrs of England and Wales)
 John Plessington (c. 1630–1679), English priest and martyrone of the Forty Martyrs of England and Wales
 Saint John Lloyd (died 1679), Welsh priest and martyr (one of the Forty Martyrs of England and Wales)
 John de Britto (1647–1693), Portuguese missionary and martyr
 John of Tobolsk (1651–1715), Metropolitan of Tobolsk
 Jean-Baptiste de La Salle (1651–1719), French priest; founder of the Institute of the Brothers of the Christian Schools
 John Joseph of the Cross (1654–1739), Ischian friar, priest and Vicar Provincial of the Alcantarine Reform in Italy
 John Dat (c. 1765–1798), Vietnamese priest and martyr
 Jean Vianney (1786–1859), French priest
 John Hoan Trinh Doan (c. 1789/1798–1861), Vietnamese priest and martyr
 John Thanh Van Dinh (1796–1840), Vietnamese martyr
 John Baptist Y (1800–1839), one of the Korean Martyrs
 John Henry Newman (1801–1890), English Oratorian priest, convert from Anglicanism
 John Gabriel Perboyre (1802–1840), or Jean-Gabriel Perboyre, French missionary and martyr
 John Baptist Con (1805–1840), Vietnamese martyr
 John Charles Cornay (1809–1837), or Jean-Charles Cornay, French missionary and martyr
 John Neumann (1811–1860), Bohemian missionary, Bishop of Philadelphia, founder of the first American Catholic diocesan school system
 John Bosco (1815–1888), Italian priest and educator; founder of the Salesians of Don Bosco and the Salesian Cooperators
 John of Kronstadt (1829–1909), Russian archpriest and synod member
 John of Shanghai and San Francisco (1896–1966), also known as John the Wonderworker, Archbishop of Shanghai and San Francisco
 Pope John XXIII (1881–1963), Italian pope from 1958 to 1963
 Pope John Paul II (1920–2005), Polish pope from 1978 to 2005

Places

Antigua and Barbuda
St. John's, Antigua and Barbuda, the capital city of Antigua and Barbuda
Saint John Parish, Antigua and Barbuda, a parish of Antigua and Barbuda on the island of Antigua

Canada                                                                                    
 Saint John (electoral district), Saint John—Rothesay in New Brunswick
 Saint John, New Brunswick, a port city on the Bay of Fundy
 St. John's, Newfoundland and Labrador, the capital and largest city in Newfoundland and Labrador
 Fort St. John, British Columbia
 Port of Saint John in the city of Saint John, New Brunswick, Canada
 Roman Catholic Diocese of Saint John, New Brunswick, a suffragan of the Archdiocese of Moncton
 Roman Catholic Archdiocese of St. John's, Newfoundland
 Saint-Jean-sur-Richelieu, Quebec, known as St. John's to early English settlers

United Kingdom
St John, Cornwall, England

United States and territories
 St. John, Florida
 St. John, Indiana
 Saint John, Warrick County, Indiana
 St. John, Kansas
 Saint John, Kentucky
 St. John the Baptist Parish, Louisiana
 Saint John Plantation, Maine
 Saint John River (Bay of Fundy), from northern Maine into Canada
 St. John, Missouri
 St. John, Pulaski County, Missouri
 St. John, North Dakota
 St. John, Utah, Rush Valley, Utah
 Saint John, Austin, Texas, a neighborhood
 St. John, Washington
 St. John, Wisconsin
 Saint John, U.S. Virgin Islands, an island in the Caribbean Sea
 Saint John, Saint Croix, U.S. Virgin Islands, a small town on Saint Croix
 Saints John, Colorado (note the plural)
 St. John Township (disambiguation)

South Africa

 Port St. Johns 
 St John's College, Johannesburg

Elsewhere
Saint John Parish, Antigua and Barbuda, a parish of Antigua and Barbuda on the island of Antigua
Saint John Parish, Barbados
Saint John Parish, Dominica
Saint John Parish, Grenada
Saint John, Jersey, a parish of Jersey in the Channel Islands
Saint John, Malacca, original name of the Portuguese Settlement in Malaysia

Other uses
 St. John (clothing), a luxury American fashion brand
 St. John (crater), an eroded lunar impact crater on the Moon's far side
 St. John (restaurant), Smithfield, London
 St. John's College, Oxford, Oxford University
 St. John's University, Queens, New York
 St. John Publications, a defunct American magazine and Golden Age comic book publisher
 "St. John", a song by Aerosmith from Permanent Vacation (Aerosmith album), 1987
 St John Ambulance, a foundation established by the Order of St. John
 Saint John's Eve
 Venerable Order of Saint John, a royal order of chivalry established in 1831
 Saint Jhn, American musician

See also
 
 
John (disambiguation)
John the Divine (disambiguation)
Saint John Cemetery (disambiguation)
Saint John's (disambiguation)
St. John the Baptist (disambiguation)
Agios Ioannis (disambiguation) (Greek)
Saint Juan (disambiguation) (Spanish)
Saint-Jean (disambiguation) (French)
San Giovanni (disambiguation) (Italian)
San Juan (disambiguation) (Spanish)
Sankt Johann (disambiguation) (German)
Sant Joan (disambiguation) (Catalan)
São João (disambiguation) (Portuguese)
Sveti Ivan (disambiguation) (Croatian)